Standings and results for Group 5 of the UEFA Euro 1996 qualifying tournament.

Standings

Results

Goalscorers

References

A. Yelagin - History of European Championships 1960-2000 (Terra-Sport, Moscow, 2002) - attendance information

Group 5
1994–95 in Czech football
qual
1994–95 in Dutch football
Qual
1994 in Norwegian football
1995 in Norwegian football
1994 in Belarusian football
1995 in Belarusian football
1994–95 in Luxembourgian football
1995–96 in Luxembourgian football
1994–95 in Maltese football
1995–96 in Maltese football